Miriam Mehadipur is a resident Israeli Tzfat artist. Born in 's-Hertogenbosch, the Netherlands in 1960, She moved to Israel in 1999 with Persian-Jewish husband Menachem Mehadipur.

References

Israeli artists
1960 births
Living people